In taxonomy, a nomen nudum ('naked name'; plural nomina nuda) is a designation which looks exactly like a scientific name of an organism, and may have originally been intended to be one, but it has not been published with an adequate description. This makes it a "bare" or "naked" name, which cannot be accepted as it stands. A largely equivalent but much less frequently used term is nomen tantum ("name only").

In zoology
According to the rules of zoological nomenclature a nomen nudum is unavailable; the glossary of the International Code of Zoological Nomenclature gives this definition:

And among the rules of that same Zoological Code:

In botany
According to the rules of botanical nomenclature a nomen nudum is not validly published. The glossary of the International Code of Nomenclature for algae, fungi, and plants gives this definition:
 The requirements for the diagnosis or description are covered by articles 32, 36, 41, 42, and 44.

Nomina nuda that were published before 1 January 1959 can be used to establish a cultivar name. For example, Veronica sutherlandii, a nomen nudum, has been used as the basis for Hebe pinguifolia 'Sutherlandii'.

See also
 Glossary of scientific naming
 Nomen dubium

References

 
Botanical nomenclature
Zoological nomenclature
Latin biological phrases